Alderac Entertainment Group, or AEG, is a publisher of role-playing game, board game, and collectible card game products.  AEG was formed by Jolly Blackburn in 1993 and is based in the city of Ontario, California.  Prior to getting into their current markets, AEG was involved in hobby gaming magazines, with their first product the magazine Shadis (winner of the 1994, 1995, and 1996 Origins Awards for Best Professional Gaming Magazine).

Including the three for Shadis mentioned above, AEG products have garnered eight Origins Awards (see the individual articles noted below for more details).

In 2009, AEG entered the board games market with 10 new board game releases.  Notable successes include Thunderstone and Smash Up.

Products

Collectible card games 
 7th Sea Collectible Card Game  (Multiple Origins Award winner)
 City of Heroes Collectible Card Game
 Doomtown Collectible Card Game  (Multiple Origins Award winner)
 HumAliens
 Initial D
 Legend of the Five Rings Collectible Card Game (Multiple Origins Award Winner)
 Legend of the Burning Sands
 Romance of the Nine Empires
 Spycraft Collectible Card Game
 Warlord: Saga of the Storm

Board games 
 Tiny Towns
 The Adventurers
 Arcana
 Infinite City
 Tomb
 Tomb: Cryptmaster
 Abandon Ship
 Monkey Lab
 Isle of Doctor Necreaux
 Rush N' Crush
 Smash Up series
 Smash Up: Awesome Level 9000
 Smash Up: The Obligatory Cthulhu Set
 Smash Up: Science Fiction Double Feature
 Smash Up: Monster Smash
 Smash Up: Pretty Pretty Smash Up
 Smash Up: Munchkin (standalone expansion)
 Smash Up: It's Your Fault
 Smash Up: Cease and Desist
 Smash Up: What Were We Thinking?
 Smash Up: Big in Japan
 Smash Up: That 70's Expansion
 Smash Up: Oops You Did It Again
 Smash Up: Big Geeky Box (accessory/expansion)
 Smash Up: World Tour: International Incident
 Smash Up: World Tour: Culture Shock
 Smash Up: Marvel (standalone expansion)
 Smash Up: Goblins
 Space Base
 Straw
 Myth: Pantheons
 Pressure Matrix
 The Tempest Series of Games
 Courtier
 Mercante
 Dominare
 Love Letter
 Pretense
 War Chest
 War Chest: Nobility
 War Chest: Siege
 Mariposas
 Cat Lady

Deck-building card games 
 Thunderstone
 Mystic Vale
 Nightfall
 Valley of the Kings
 Valley of the Kings - Afterlife
 Edge of Darkness
 Dead Reckoning
 Trains (also a board game, Origins Award winner)

Role-playing games 
 many d20 System Sourcebooks such as
 Evil
 Dungeons: A Guide to Survival in the Realms Below 
Sundered Faith
 Brave New World
 Farscape Roleplaying Game
 Legend of the Five Rings Role-Playing Game (Origins Award winner)
 Shadowforce Archer
 Spycraft
 Stargate SG-1
 Swashbuckling Adventures (previously 7th Sea which won an Origins Award)
 Ultimate Toolbox
 Warlords of the Accordlands
 World's Largest Dungeon
 World's Largest City

Miniatures
Clan War (Legend of the Five Rings Miniature Combat)

References

External links 
 AEG's official site

Card game publishing companies
Role-playing game publishing companies
Trading card companies
Ontario, California
Companies based in San Bernardino County, California